Terasaki is a Japanese surname. Notable people with the surname include:

Hisako Terasaki (born 1928), Japanese-American etcher
Kōgyō Terasaki (1866–1919), Japanese painter
Paul Terasaki (1929–2016), Japanese-American academic
, Japanese voice actress, actress and singer

Japanese-language surnames